Joseph Anthony Mugnaini (July 12, 1912 in Viareggio, Province of Lucca – January 23, 1992) was an Italian-born American artist and illustrator. He is best known for his collaborations with writer Ray Bradbury, beginning in 1952.

Biography 
He was born Giuseppe Mugnaini in Viareggio in the Tuscany region of Italy and immigrated with his family to America when he was three months old. He and his family resided on Solano Avenue in Los Angeles during the 1930s, and Altadena during the late 1950s. He became an American citizen in 1941.

He taught art at the Pasadena School of Fine Arts, among others.

He died in Los Angeles on January 23, 1992.

Bibliography
Books by Mugnaini include:
 Drawing: A Search for Form (1965)
 Oil painting: Techniques and Materials (1969)
 The Hidden Elements of Drawing (1974)
 Joseph Mugnaini: Drawings and Graphics (1982)
 Expressive Drawing: A Schematic Approach (1989)

References

Further reading
 Who Was Who in American Art. 2nd edition. Edited by Peter Hastings Falk. Sound View Press, 1999. .
 A Biographical Dictionary of Science Fiction and Fantasy Artists. By Robert Weinberg. Greenwood Press, 1988. .
 Who's Who in American Art. 12th edition. R.R. Bowker, 1976.
 Biography Index. Volume 6. H.W. Wilson Co., 1965.

External links
Oral Histories and Interviews 
Audio interview of Joseph Mugnaini on Illustrating for Ray Bradbury
Photography of Joseph Mugnaini with illustration for Bradbury
Photograph of Ray Bradbury with Mugnaini painting
Book: Wilderness Of The Mind: The Art Of Joseph Mugnaini
The author of the above book with more art images
Icarus Montgolfier Wright 1962 film; illustrated and voiced by Joe Mugnaini
Art of Joe Mugnaini

1912 births
1992 deaths
People from Viareggio
20th-century American painters
American male painters
American illustrators
Italian illustrators
Painters from Tuscany
Otis College of Art and Design alumni
Artists from Los Angeles
Italian emigrants to the United States
20th-century American male artists